Doris Meltzer (1908-1977) was an American artist and art dealer.

Biography
Meltzer was born in 1908 in Ulster County, New York. She attended the Art Students League of New York.

Meltzer was a member of the American Federation of Arts and, for a time, served as the director of the National Serigraph Society. She was also an art dealer and gallery owner.

Meltzer's work was included in the 1940 MoMA show American Color Prints Under $10 The show was organized as a vehicle for bringing affordable fine art prints to the general public. She was also included in the 1947 and the 1951 Dallas Museum of Fine Arts exhibitions of the National Serigraph Society.

Her work is in the collection of the National Gallery of Art and the Virginia Museum of Fine Arts.

Meltzer died on October 18, 1977 in New York City. Her papers are in the Archives of American Art at the Smithsonian Institution.

References

External links
 images of Meltzer's work at the National Gallery of Art

1908 births
1977 deaths
20th-century American women artists